is the 38th studio album by Japanese singer-songwriter Miyuki Nakajima, released in November 2011.

The first two tracks on From the Icy Reaches were released as a lead single in October 2011. The title track was featured in the blockbuster TV drama Nankyoku Tairiku starring Takuya Kimura and aired on TBS. Over a half of the song appeared on the album were written for her musical Yakai Vol.17 2/2 played from November to December 2011 —"Wagtail", "He, I, and the Other", "Really Crazy About You", "Give and Take", "Wanderer Comeback to Me" and "Homecoming Crowd".

The album debuted at No. 4 on the Japanese Oricon Weekly chart, one rank higher than its predecessor Midnight Zoo released in 2010.

Track listing
All songs written and composed by Miyuki Nakajima, arranged by Ichizō Seo (except M5 co-arranged by Shingo Kobayashi, and M7 co-arranged by Satoshi Nakamura)
"" – 5:42
"" – 5:24
"Ba-Na-Na" – 4:27
"" – 4:30
"" – 5:15
"" – 5:25
"" – 4:05
"" – 5:42
"" – 6:34
"" – 5:37
"" – 6:07

Personnel
Miyuki Nakajima – Vocals
Vinnie Colaiuta – Drums
Neil Stubenhaus – Electric bass
Michael Thompson – Electric guitar, acoustic guitar
Nozomi Furukawa – Electric guitar, acoustic guitar
Doug Livingston – Pedal steel guitar
Jon Gilutin – Acoustic piano, electric piano, keyboards, hammond organ
Jia Peng Fang – Erhu
Shingo Kobayashi – Acoustic piano, keyboards, synth programming
Satoshi Nakamura – Saxophone
Taro Shizuoka – Trombone
Shuichiro Terao – Trumpet
Ittetsu Gen – Violin
Maki Nagata – Violin
Koji Ohtake – Violin
Kaoru Kuroki – Violin
Kenta Kuroki – Violin
Yoshiko Kaneko – Violin
Takuya Mori – Violin
Yuko Kajitani – Violin
Yayoi Fujita – Violin
Shiori Takeda – Violin
Ayako Himata – Violin
Shoko Miki – Viola
Daisuke Kadowaki – Viola
Kaori Morita – Cello
Toshiyuki Muranaka – Cello
Tomoki Iwanaga – Cello
Fumikazu Miyashita – Background vocals
Ichizo Seo – Background vocals
Yuiko Tsubokura – Background vocals
Yasuhiro Kido – Background vocals
Kazuyo Sugimoto – Background vocals
Misa Nakayama – Background vocals
Naoki Takao – Background vocals
Julia Waters – Background vocals
Maxine Waters – Background vocals
Oren Waters – Background vocals
Luther N. Waters – Background vocals
Terry Wood – Background vocals
Terry Young – Background vocals

Chart positions

Release history

References

External links 
 From The Icy Reaches/Made in Japan ONLY (Album Review)

2011 albums
Miyuki Nakajima albums